Drew Brophy is an American artist born in 1971. Known as a "surf artist" Brophy is best known for his surfboard paintings and distinctive painting style, using Uni-Posca water-based paint pens.

A self-taught artist, Brophy began painting on surfboards as a young boy when he first began to surf in his native South Carolina. Originally, Brophy set out to be a professional surfer, and he traveled the globe using artwork to help pay for his surf adventures. More and more, he was commissioned to create art, and a lifetime profession was born.

After living and surfing in Hawaii in the 1990s, Brophy moved to California in 1996 as a career decision.  He now lives with his wife and their son.he is currently 50 years old and has been an artist for over 30 years.

Brophy became known as the artist who pioneered the art of surfboard painting with water-based paint pens and has taught generations of artists his techniques.

Work 
In 2018 Brophy's Autobiography titled PAINTING SURFBOARDS AND CHASING WAVES was released on Amazon.

McFly's Dougie Poynter plays a Music Man Sterling Bass, featuring a custom paint job by Brophy.

Brophy's painted surfboards have also been collected by Kid Rock, Mötley Crüe's Vince Neil, Eddie Vedder and Uncle Cracker.

In 2012 Brophy featured in the seminal book Surf Graphics

In spring of 2011, Crystal Cove Media Production Company  produced a television show called THE PAINT SHOP WITH DREW BROPHY, which aired on Southern California local television channels, including Cox and Time Warner.  THE PAINT SHOP is a reality show which takes the viewers behind the scenes of Drew's art studio and projects.

In May 2011, Brophy teamed up with whitewater expert and film-maker Seth Warren, to become the first ever to standup paddleboard the entire length of the 225 miles of the Colorado River between Lee's Ferry Arizona, to Diamond Creek, Arizona.  The expedition took 16 days and was run at a time when the water level was its highest since 1983.  They navigated over 125 rapids, 42 of which were rated between 5g and 10g, on the Grand Canyon scale of 1-10g.

In 2010, Walter Foster Publishing Company published "How to Draw with Drew Brophy" a book authored by Drew Brophy and Maria Brophy, designed to give drawing instruction to children.

In 2008, Mutiny Media distributed an instructional DVD titled "Paint Pen Techniques with Drew Brophy" in which Brophy demonstrates how to use the techniques he developed with water based opaque paint pens.

An artists' advocate, Brophy leads seminars and workshops at various schools and colleges, sharing his painting techniques and his secrets of success as an artist.

References

External links
Official website
Surf Shot Magazine
The Paint Shop with Drew Brophy Vimeo Channel
https://agar.io/#ffa Surf Expo Industry News

1971 births
20th-century American painters
American male painters
21st-century American painters
Living people
Surf culture
20th-century American male artists